Rezaabad (also Romanized as Reẕāābād and Rezāābād) is a village in Azna Rural District, in the Central District of Khorramabad County, Lorestan Province, Iran. At the 2006 census, its population was 100, in 22 families.

References 

Towns and villages in Khorramabad County